The 2011 Toppserien was the twenty-fifth season of top-tier women's football in Norway since its establishment in 1987. A total of twelve teams contested the league, consisting of ten who competed in the previous season and two promoted from the 1. divisjon. The season started on 2 April 2011 and will end on 29 October 2011.

Changes from 2010
 Norway overtook Iceland in the UEFA coefficient rankings for eighth spot in the 2012–13 European season. Thus Norway gains a second entry for the Champions League which is naturally given to the season's runner-up.

Teams

Teams not returning for this season, after being relegated in 2010 were IF Fløya and FK Donn. Donn finished 9th of 12 but were denied a license for 2011.
Teams entering this season, after being promoted in 2010 are IL Sandviken and Medkila IL.

League table

Results

Top goalscorers

References

External links
Season on soccerway.com

Toppserien seasons
Top level Norwegian women's football league seasons
1
Norway
Norway